Meusnes is a commune in the Loir-et-Cher department of central France.

History
The church of Saint-Pierre dates from the 12th century and is built in the typical Romanesque basilica style: cross shaped with three apses at the east end.

Population

See also
Communes of the Loir-et-Cher department

References

Communes of Loir-et-Cher